Chung Sanghwa (born 1932, Yeongdeok County, North Gyeongsang, Korea) is a South Korean minimalist and Dansaekhwa (monochromatic) painter. After receiving his BFA from College of Fine Arts in Seoul National University in 1956, Chung briefly moved to Paris in 1967. Coming from a generation of post-war artists, Chung's reductive process of painting consists of repetitive application and removal of the paint on canvas. Chung held national and international exhibitions, including FROM ALL SIDES: TANSAEKHWA ON ABSTRACTION at Blum & Poe Gallery in Los Angeles. In 2015, Chung Sanghwa's paintings were included in Frieze New York Art Fair. Gallery Hyundai (Seoul, Korea) has organized more than 25 of Chung's exhibitions, including 9 solo shows since 1983. From 1996, Chung began to work in recluse in Yeosu, Gyeonggido Province. Chung's works are in permanent collection of the Samsung Leeum Museum of Art, the Seoul Museum of Art in Seoul, the National Museum of Modern Art in Tokyo, the Shizuoka Prefectural Museum of Art and the Fukuoka Asian Art Museum.

References

See also
 Dansaekhwa
 Monochrome painting
 Abstract expressionism
 Mono-ha
 Lee U-Fan

1932 births
Seoul National University alumni
Living people
20th-century South Korean painters
21st-century South Korean painters
People from North Gyeongsang Province